USS Olmsted (APA-188) was a  that saw service with the US Navy for the task of transporting troops to and from combat areas. She was of the VC2-S-AP5 Victory ship design type. Olmsted was named for Olmsted County, Minnesota.

World War II service
Olmsted (APA–188), approved 16 March 1944, was laid down by Kaiser Shipbuilding Co., Vancouver, Washington, 11 April 1944, as MCV Hull no. 656; launched 4 July 1944; sponsored by Mrs. Duncan Gregg; accepted and commissioned 5 September 1944.

Western Pacific operations
 
On completion of shakedown 27 October 1944, Olmsted joined the U.S. Pacific Fleet. Transporting troops and supplies in support of amphibious operations, she spent the last year of the war in the Pacific Ocean with an itinerary that reads like a summary of the war's climactic stages: New Guinea, the Admiralties, Leyte, Lingayen Gulf, Okinawa and Japan.
 
Apparently charmed, she was bombed at Luzon and again at Okinawa without damage. Twice before the surrender of Japan, she returned to the States to lift reserve troops into the battle zone. She was in Japan to participate in the first occupational landings there, debarking the Army's 81st (Wildcat) Division.

Getting U.S. troops back to the States
Landing the 81st at Honshū was Olmsted’s last full dress amphibious operation before post war “Operation Magic Carpet” duty. Olmsted made three voyages from the states to the war torn Western Pacific to return veterans and materials until she was ordered to the U.S. East Coast for deactivation.

Reactivated during Korean War
 
On 21 February 1947, Olmsted was placed out of commission in reserve at Norfolk, Virginia. Due to deteriorating international conditions, Olmsted was recalled to active service and commissioned 2 February 1952 under command of Captain R. C. Leonard, and assigned to the Amphibious Force, Atlantic Fleet.
 
After shakedown, operating out of Norfolk, Olmsted participated in training exercises along the U.S. East Coast, at Guantánamo Bay and in the Mediterranean conducting amphibious assault landings. Her primary mission was training Marines and Sailors in Amphibious Warfare tactics. She also conducted training cruises for Midshipmen and Naval Reservists. With interim periods for overhaul and operational readiness training, Olmsted served in this capacity until she decommissioned 27 February 1959, at Norfolk, Virginia, and was assigned to the Norfolk Group, Atlantic Reserve Fleet, 14 January 1960.

Fate
Transferred to the custody of MARAD, 30 June 1960, Olmsted was struck from the Naval Register 1 July 1960.

On 1 August 1983, the Waterman Steamship Corporation bought Olmsted and then resold her to Balbao Desquaces Maritimos for scrapping. She was withdrawn from the fleet on 16 September 1983.

Military awards and honors
 
Olmsted earned one battle stars for service in World War II.

References

Bibliography 

Online resources

External links
 NavSource Online: Amphibious Photo Archive - APA/LPA-188 Olmstead

 

Olmsted County, Minnesota
Haskell-class attack transports
World War II amphibious warfare vessels of the United States
Korean War amphibious warfare vessels of the United States
Troop ships
Ships built in Vancouver, Washington
1944 ships